Roselia may refer to:
 Roselia (band), a Japanese all-female band
 Roselia (Pokémon), a Pokémon species

See also
 Lia, a feminine given name
 Rosalia (disambiguation)
 "Rosealia", a song by Better Than Ezra